Clavatula congoensis is a species of sea snail, a marine gastropod mollusk in the family Clavatulidae.

Description
The shell grows to a length of 16 mm.

Distribution
This species occurs in the Atlantic Ocean off the Republic of Congo.

References

 Nolf, F.; Verstraeten, J. (2008). Two new turrid species from Congo-Brazzaville: Clavatula hattenbergeri and Clavatula congoensis (Mollusca: Gastropoda: Clavatulidae) Neptunea 7(1): 17–20, plates I-IX

External links
 

Endemic fauna of the Republic of the Congo
congoensis
Gastropods described in 2008